Xysticus ferox, the brown crab spider, is a species of crab spider in the family Thomisidae. It is found in the USA and Canada.

References

Further reading

 
 
 

Thomisidae
Spiders described in 1847